The 2007–08 Scottish League Cup was the 62nd staging of the Scotland's second most prestigious football knockout competition, also known for sponsorship reasons as the CIS Insurance Cup.

Rangers won the cup by defeating Dundee United in the Final, winning 3–2 on penalties after the match was drawn 2–2 after extra-time.

First round

Source: BBC Sport

Second round

Source: BBC Sport

Third round

Quarter-finals

Semi-finals

Final

Top scorers

Media coverage
In Australia the Scottish League Cup is currently available on Setanta Sports who also broadcast it in Ireland. In the UK the Scottish League Cup is currently broadcast on BBC Scotland.

External links
 BBC Scottish Cups page

Scottish League Cup seasons
League Cup